Kirsty Leigh Coventry Seward (born 16 September 1983) is a Zimbabwean swimmer and politician currently serving as the Minister of Youth, Sport, Arts and Recreation in the Cabinet of Zimbabwe since September 2018. A former Olympic swimmer and world record holder, she is the most decorated Olympian from Africa. She is a member of the International Olympic Committee (IOC), and was elected the Chairperson of the IOC Athletes' Commission, the body that represents all Olympic athletes worldwide in early 2018.

Born in Harare, Coventry attended and swam competitively for Auburn University in Alabama, in the United States. At the 2004 Summer Olympics, in Athens, Greece, Coventry won three Olympic medals: a gold, a silver, and a bronze, while in the 2008 Summer Olympics in Beijing she won four medals: a gold and three silver. She was subsequently described by Paul Chingoka, head of the Zimbabwe Olympic Committee, as "our national treasure".

Zimbabwean President Robert Mugabe called her "a golden girl," and personally awarded her US$100,000 in cash for her 2008 Olympic performance. In 2016, Coventry retired from swimming after her fifth Olympics, having won the joint-most individual medals in women's swimming in Olympic history.

Swimming career

2000 Olympics 
In 2000, while still in high school, Coventry became the first Zimbabwean swimmer to reach the semifinals at the Olympics and was named Zimbabwe's Sports Woman of the Year.

2004 Olympics 
At the 2004 Olympics in Athens, Coventry won three medals, including a gold medal in the 200 meter backstroke.

College career 
As a student at Auburn University, Coventry helped lead the Tigers to National Collegiate Athletic Association (NCAA) Championships in 2003 and 2004. In 2005, she was the top individual scorer at the NCAA Championships and captured three individual titles including the 200-yard and 400 y individual medley (IM), and the 200 y backstroke for the second consecutive season. She was named the College Swimming Coaches Association Swimmer of the Meet for her efforts. Other awards include 2005 Southeastern Conference (SEC) Swimmer of the Year, and the 2004–05 SEC Female Athlete of the Year. She was also the recipient of the 2004–05 Honda Sports Award for Swimming and Diving, recognizing her as the outstanding college female swimmer of the year.

2005 World Championships 
At the 2005 World Championships in Montreal, Coventry improved on her 2004 Olympic medal count by winning gold in both the 100 m and 200 m backstroke and silver in the 200 m and the 400 m IM. She bettered her Olympic gold-winning 200 m backstroke time with a performance of 2:08.52. She was one of just two swimmers from Zimbabwe along with rising junior Warren Paynter. Her performance allowed her country to rank third in the medal count by nation. In addition, she picked up the female swimmer of the meet honors.

2007 World Championships 
In Melbourne at the 2007 World Championships, Coventry won silver medals in the 200 m backstroke and 200 m IM. She was disqualified in the 400 m IM when finishing second to eventual winner Katie Hoff in her heat. Coventry finished in a disappointing 14th place in the 100 m backstroke in a time of 1:01.73, failing to qualify for the final. She continued her good form of 2007 by winning four gold medals at the International Swim Meet in Narashino, Japan. She led the way in the 200 m and 400 m IM as well as the 100 m and 200 m backstroke.

2008 
In 2008, Coventry broke her first world record in the 200 m backstroke at the Missouri Grand Prix. She bettered the mark set by Krisztina Egerszegi in August 1991, the second oldest swimming world record. Her new record was 2:06:39. Coventry continued her winning streak at the meet by winning the 100 m backstroke and the 200 m IM. Coventry is the third woman in history to break the 1:00 minute barrier in the 100 m backstroke, and the second to break the 59-second barrier.

At the 2008 Manchester Short Course World Championships, Coventry broke her second world record, setting a time, whilst winning the gold medal, of 4:26:52 in the 400 m IM. The following day saw Coventry win her second gold medal of the championships in the 100 m backstroke. Her time of 57:10 was a new championship record and the second fastest time in history in the event. Only Natalie Coughlin has swum faster (56:51). Day three of the championships saw Coventry break another championship record in qualifying fastest for the final of the 200 m backstroke. Her time of 2:03:69 was a mere four tenths of a second outside the current world record set by Reiko Nakamura in Tokyo in 2008. Coventry then bettered this time to take her second world record of the championships by winning the final in a time of 2:00:91. She then went on to shatter the short course World Record in winning the 200 m individual medley in 2:06:13. Due to her performances at the World Championships, Coventry was named as the FINA Female Swimmer of the Championships.

Coventry represented Zimbabwe at the 2008 Summer Olympics in Beijing. Coventry won the silver medal in the 400 m individual medley on 10 August 2008, becoming the second woman to swim the medley in less than 4:30, the first being Stephanie Rice who won the gold in the same event. Coventry beat the world record by just under two seconds, and was only just beaten by Rice to a new world record. Coventry, in the second semi-final of the 100 m Backstroke, set a new world record of 58.77 seconds. However, in the final of that event she was beaten to the gold medal by Natalie Coughlin. Coventry was again beaten by Stephanie Rice in the 200 m individual medley, despite swimming under the old world record. Coventry did defend her Olympic title in the 200 m backstroke, winning gold in a world record time of 2:05.24.

Awarded US$100,000 by President Mugabe for her success at the Olympics, Coventry gave that money to charity.

2009 World Championships 

At the 2009 World Championships in Rome, Coventry won a gold and a silver. She won the 200 m backstroke world title with a world record time and came second in the 400 m individual medley. She came fourth in the 200 m individual medley final and eighth in the 100 m backstroke final.

2012 and 2016 Olympics 

At the 2012 Olympics in London, Coventry finished third in her semifinal heat of the 200 m individual medley, just edging her into the final, where she placed 6th with a time of 2:11.13. In the 200 m backstroke, she finished outside the medals in sixth place with a time of 2:08.18.

Her fifth and final Olympic appearance came at the 2016 Olympics in Rio de Janeiro, where she repeated her 6th-place performance in the 200 meter backstroke from 2012, with a time of 2:08.80. She also finished 11th in the 100 meter backstroke. She retired after the 2016 Olympics.

International Olympic Committee
In 2012, she was elected to the International Olympic Committee Athletes' Commission. She is serving as an IOC member for eight years.

Political career
On 7 September 2019, eight days shy of her 35th birthday, Coventry was appointed Minister of Youth, Sport, Arts and Recreation in Zimbabwe's 20-member Cabinet under President Emmerson Mnangagwa. 

Her tenure has received criticism from the arts community and others due to perceived inaction and lack of support.

Coventry was accused of having been misallocated farmland by Robert Zhuwao, former President Robert Mugabe's nephew, but was cleared after it was revealed in court that she received a completely different subdivision of the farm in question and that Zhuwao had abandoned his unrelated subdivision.

Personal life
Coventry attended Dominican Convent High School, Harare, in Zimbabwe until 1999.

On 10 August 2013, Coventry married Tyrone Seward who had been her manager since 2010.
In May 2019, she gave birth to her first child.

Swimming results
With seven Olympic medals, Coventry is the most decorated Olympian from Africa. Together with Krisztina Egerszegi, she also won the most individual Olympic medals in women's swimming. She competed at five Olympics, from 2000–2016. She won all but one of Zimbabwe's Olympic medals.

2002 Commonwealth Games medals
 Gold in the 200 m IM (2:14.53)

2004 Olympic medals
 Bronze in the 200 m IM (2:12.72) – Zimbabwe's second Olympic medal
 Gold in the 200 m backstroke (2:09.19)
 Silver in the 100 m backstroke (1:00.50)

2005 World Championship medals
 Gold in the 100 m backstroke (1:00.24)
 Gold in the 200 m backstroke (2:08.52)
 Silver in the 200 m IM (2:11.13)
 Silver in the 400 m IM (4:39.72)

2007 All-Africa Games
 Gold in the 200 m IM (2:13.02 CR)
 Gold in the 400 m IM (4:39.91 CR)
 Gold in the 50 m freestyle (26.19)
 Gold in the 800 m freestyle (8:43.89 CR)
 Gold in the 50 m backstroke (28.89 AR)
 Gold in the 100 m backstroke (1:01.28 CR)
 Gold in the 200 m backstroke (2:10.66 CR)
 Silver in the 100 m breaststroke (1:11.86)
 Silver in the 4 × 100 m medley (4:21.60 NR)
 Silver in the 4 × 200 m freestyle (8:38.20 NR)

2007 World Championship medals
 Silver in the 200 m backstroke (2:07.54)
 Silver in the 200 m IM (2:10.74)

2008 Olympic Medals
 Silver in the 400 m IM (4:29.89 AR)
 Silver in the 100 m Backstroke (59.19)(58.77 WR semis)
 Silver in the 200 m IM (2:08.59 AR)
 Gold in the 200 m Backstroke (2:05.24) WR

2009 World Championship medals
 Gold in the 200 m backstroke (2:04.81) WR
 Silver in the 400 m IM (4:32.12)

2011 All-Africa Games
 Gold in the 200 m IM (2:13.70)
 Gold in the 400 m IM (4:44.34)
 Gold in the 100 m backstroke (1:00.86 CR)
 Gold in the 200 m backstroke (2:12.40)
 Silver in the 100 m butterfly (1:02.20)
 Silver in the 4 × 100 m medley (4:24.01)
 Silver in the 4 × 100 m freestyle (3:57.81)
 Silver in the 4 × 200 m freestyle

2015 All-Africa Games
 Gold 100m Backstroke (1:01.15)
 Gold 200m Backstroke (2:13.29)
 Gold 200m Individual Medley (2:16.05)

See also
 World record progression 100 metres backstroke
 World record progression 200 metres backstroke

References

External links
 

1983 births
Living people
Alumni of Dominican Convent High School
Auburn Tigers women's swimmers
Olympic gold medalists for Zimbabwe
Olympic silver medalists for Zimbabwe
Olympic bronze medalists for Zimbabwe
Olympic swimmers of Zimbabwe
Sportspeople from Harare
Swimmers at the 2000 Summer Olympics
Swimmers at the 2004 Summer Olympics
Swimmers at the 2008 Summer Olympics
Swimmers at the 2012 Summer Olympics
Swimmers at the 2016 Summer Olympics
World record setters in swimming
Zimbabwean expatriates in the United States
Zimbabwean female butterfly swimmers
Zimbabwean people of British descent
Swimmers at the 1998 Commonwealth Games
Swimmers at the 2002 Commonwealth Games
Commonwealth Games gold medallists for Zimbabwe
Zimbabwean female backstroke swimmers
White Zimbabwean sportspeople
Zimbabwean female medley swimmers
Olympic bronze medalists in swimming
Zimbabwean female freestyle swimmers
World Aquatics Championships medalists in swimming
International Olympic Committee members
Medalists at the FINA World Swimming Championships (25 m)
Medalists at the 2008 Summer Olympics
Medalists at the 2004 Summer Olympics
Olympic gold medalists in swimming
Olympic silver medalists in swimming
Commonwealth Games medallists in swimming
African Games gold medalists for Zimbabwe
African Games medalists in swimming
African Games silver medalists for Zimbabwe
African Games bronze medalists for Zimbabwe
Competitors at the 2007 All-Africa Games
Competitors at the 2011 All-Africa Games
Competitors at the 2015 African Games
Sportsperson-politicians
Zimbabwean female breaststroke swimmers
Medallists at the 2002 Commonwealth Games